Knobhead is a massive ice-free mountain,  high, standing south of the western end of the Kukri Hills and overlooking Ferrar Glacier and Taylor Glacier at their point of apposition, in Victoria Land, Antarctica. It was discovered by the British National Antarctic Expedition (1901–04) and so named because of its appearance.

See also
Gusty Gully

References

Mountains of Victoria Land
McMurdo Dry Valleys